Encyclia plicata is a species of orchid.

plicata